Lee Eun-jeong (born 27 October 1976) is a South Korean former professional tennis player.

Lee began competing in professional tournaments in the 1990s and reached a best singles world ranking of 316 during her career. She won three singles titles on the ITF Women's Circuit in 2004, including the $25,000 Changwon Challenger. Her husband Kim Yong-seung was also a tennis player.

ITF Circuit finals

Singles: 6 (3–3)

Doubles: 7 (1–6)

References

External links
 
 

1976 births
Living people
South Korean female tennis players